GTI may refer to:

Automotive 
 Grand Tourer Injection, a car model variant
 Maserati 3500 GTI, the first GTI car ever, from 1961
 Volkswagen Golf GTI, the first GTI hot hatch
 Peugeot 205 GTI, a famous hot hatch
 Suzuki Swift GTi, Suzuki GTi variant
 GTi Engineering, an auto racing team

Other uses 
 Atlas Air, ICAO code GTI
 Galway Technical Institute, a third level educational facility in Galway, Ireland
 Gas Technology Institute, an American non-profit research and development organization
 Gerakan Tani Indonesia, a peasants organization in Indonesia
 Global Terrorism Index, a report published annually by the Institute for Economics and Peace (IEP)
 Global Tiger Initiative, a conservation effort funded in part by the World Bank
 GrafTech, a graphite manufacturing company, NYSE symbol GTI
 Grid-tie inverter, an apparatus to convert DC electrical (solar, wind) energy to AC and deliver it back to the grid
 GT Interactive, a video game publisher and distributor
 GTI Club, a racing game originally released for the arcades in 1996 by Konami
 GTI Mortsel, a vocational secondary school in Mortsel, Belgium
 Guilford Transportation Industries, a transportation company
 Gires–Tournois interferometer, a component for Femtosecond lasers.
 Pokémon Mystery Dungeon: Gates to Infinity, a 2012 game in the Pokémon Mystery Dungeon series